The Liberal Party was formally established in 1859 and existed until merging with the Social Democratic Party in 1988 to create the Liberal Democrats.

Leadership selection 1859–1969
Before the adoption of the 1969 constitution of the party, the party was led by the prime minister or the most recent politically active prime minister from the party. In the absence of one of these, the leaders in the House of Lords and House of Commons were of equal status and jointly led the party.

When a new leader was required, with the party in government, the monarch selected him by appointing someone as Prime Minister. However, in 1916 David Lloyd George, with the support of a minority of the Liberal MPs, formed a coalition government. H. H. Asquith, the former Prime Minister, remained as Liberal Party leader. Asquith retained the leadership until his health failed in 1926, including periods when he was not in the Commons or was a peer. He was the last leader of the whole party under the original arrangements for leadership.

When no overall party leader was a member of a House and a new leader was required in opposition, a leader emerged and was approved by party members in that House. From 1919 onward, the Chairman of the Liberal Parliamentary Party, elected by MPs, functioned as the leader in the House of Commons. This required all the leaders after Asquith to retain their seat in order to continue as leader. After 1926 the leader in the House of Commons was clearly pre-eminent over the leader in the House of Lords.

In 1931 Lloyd George was leader in the House of Commons, but he was ill when negotiations led to the formation of the National Government. Sir Herbert Samuel, who had been the deputy leader, was effectively the leader of the mainstream party from the time when he entered the government. This was made formal after the 1931 general election.

Leadership selection 1969–1988
Under the original provisions of the 1969 party constitution, the MPs elected one of their number to be Leader of the Liberal Party. This was the same system as that used for the last MP only contested leadership election in 1967, when Jeremy Thorpe became leader after a vote split between three candidates of 6-3-3.

As the number of Liberal MPs was very small (between 6 and 14 during the period the MPs retained the sole power of election) party members argued for a wider franchise. Prior to the leadership election of 1976, all members were given a vote in an electoral college based on allocating electoral votes to constituency associations (which were then divided proportionately to the votes of the members of the association). The candidates were required to be members of the House of Commons, nominated by a quarter of the MPs. The electoral college system was only used once, when David Steel was elected leader.

Lists of Liberal Party Leaders

Leaders of the Liberal Party

Leaders of the Liberal Party in the House of Commons

Leaders of the Liberal Party in the House of Lords

Notes

See also
 List of United Kingdom Whig and allied party leaders (1801–1859)
 List of United Kingdom Liberal Democrat leaders
 Liberal Democrat Leader in the House of Lords
 Liberalism in the United Kingdom
 Politics of the United Kingdom

References
 David Butler and Gareth Butler, Twentieth-Century British Political Facts 1900–2000 (8th edition). Macmillan, 2000. .
 John Campbell, Lloyd George: The Goat in the Wilderness 1922–1931. Jonathan Cape, 1977. .
 Chris Cook, A Short History of the Liberal Party, 1900–2001 (6th edition). Basingstoke: Palgrave, 2002. .
 Roy Douglas, History of the Liberal Party 1895–1970. Sidgwick & Jackson, 1971. .
 Roy Jenkins, Asquith. Collins, (paperback edition) 1988. .
 Roy Jenkins, Gladstone. Macmillan, 1995. .
 Jonathan Parry, The Rise and Fall of Liberal Government in Victorian Britain. Yale, 1993..

External links
 Liberal Democrat History Group

 
Liberal Party (UK)
Liberal Party UK